The 1986 United States Senate election in Indiana was held on November 4, 1986. Incumbent Republican U.S. Senator Dan Quayle won re-election to a second term.

Major candidates

Democratic
 Jill L. Long, Valparaiso City Councilwoman

Republican
 Dan Quayle, incumbent U.S. Senator since 1980

Results

See also 
 1986 United States Senate elections

References 

Indiana
1986
1986 Indiana elections
Dan Quayle